Gary Stanley (born 4 March 1954) is an English former professional footballer who played as a midfielder in the Football League for Chelsea, Everton, Swansea City, Portsmouth and Bristol City. He also played in the North American Soccer League with Fort Lauderdale Strikers and in the Major Indoor Soccer League with Wichita Wings.

Career

Stanley started his career with Chelsea, where he turned professional in 1971 and made his league debut at the age of 21, on 16 August 1975 in a 2–1 defeat away to Sunderland in the Second Division. He helped the club to promotion to the First Division in the 1976–77 season, and remained with Chelsea until their relegation in 1979, when, after a summer in the NASL with Fort Lauderdale Strikers, he joined Everton for a fee of £300,000. He failed to show his Chelsea form with Everton, and moved on to Swansea City two years later for £150,000. Stanley won the Welsh Cup twice with Swansea, in 1982 and 1983, before spending two years with Portsmouth and three seasons in the MISL with the Wichita Wings. He returned to England in 1988 and spent a season with Bristol City before moving into non-league football with Waterlooville. After retiring as a player he worked for NTI Communications.

References

External links
 NASL/MISL stats

Living people
1954 births
Sportspeople from Burton upon Trent
English footballers
Association football midfielders
Chelsea F.C. players
Fort Lauderdale Strikers (1977–1983) players
Everton F.C. players
Swansea City A.F.C. players
Portsmouth F.C. players
Wichita Wings (MISL) players
Bristol City F.C. players
Waterlooville F.C. players
English Football League players
North American Soccer League (1968–1984) players
Major Indoor Soccer League (1978–1992) players
English expatriate sportspeople in the United States
Expatriate soccer players in the United States
English expatriate footballers